The qualification process for the 1999 FIFA Women's World Cup saw 67 teams from the six FIFA confederations compete for the 16 places in the tournament's finals. The places were divided as follows:
Africa – represented by the CAF: 2 berths
Asia – AFC: 3
Europe – UEFA: 6
North America, Central American and the Caribbean – CONCACAF: 2.5 (USA qualified automatically as hosts)
Oceania – OFC: 1
South America – CONMEBOL: 1.5

Dates : August 16, 1997 - December 19, 1998

Qualified teams

Qualification groups

Africa (CAF)

Qualified:  – 

The two African teams to qualify to the World Cup were the two finalists of the 1998 CAF Women's Championship, Nigeria and Ghana.

Asia (AFC)

Qualified:  –  – 

The three Asian teams to qualify to the World Cup were the two finalists and the third-placed of the 1997 AFC Women's Championship.

Europe (UEFA)

Qualified:  –  –  –  –  – 

The 16 teams belonging to Class A of European women's football were drawn into four groups, from which the group winners qualify for the World Cup. The four runners-up were drawn into two home-and-away knock-out matches, winners of those matches also qualifying.

North, Central America and the Caribbean (CONCACAF)

Qualified:  –  – 

The 1998 CONCACAF's Women's Championship winner Canada qualified for the FIFA Women's World Cup 1999. The runner-up Mexico qualified in two playoff-matches against the second-placed team of CONMEBOL – Argentina. The United States qualified as hosts.

Oceania (OFC)

Qualified: 

The 1998 OFC Women's Championship determined the OFC's one qualifier for the FIFA Women's World Cup 1999 – the winner Australia.

South America (CONMEBOL)

Qualified: 

The third edition of the Sudamericano Femenino (Women's South American Championship) in 1998 determined the CONMEBOL's qualifier. Brazil won the tournament.

CONCACAF–CONMEBOL play-off

The runners-up of the CONMEBOL and CONCACAF qualification tournaments played for one berth.

References

External links
Tables & results at RSSSF.com

 
World Cup qualification
Qualification
World Cup qualification
1999